"Popsicle Toes" is a song by Michael Franks. It was released in 1976 as a single from his album The Art of Tea.

The song is Franks' only Billboard Hot 100 entry, peaking at No. 43.

Chart performance

References

1976 singles
1976 songs
Reprise Records singles